Joyce Arleen Auger (sometimes spelled Augér ; September 13, 1939 – June 10, 1993) was an American soprano, known for her coloratura voice and interpretations of works by Bach, Handel, Haydn, Monteverdi, Mozart, and Schubert. She won a posthumous Grammy Award for "Best Classical Vocal Performance" in 1994.

Early life and education
Auger was born in South Gate, California and grew up in Huntington Beach. Her father, Everett Auger, was a noted minister who had emigrated from Canada with his wife Doris (nee Moody).

As a child, Auger studied voice, violin and piano. 

She received a BA in Education from California State University at Long Beach in 1963. Her first job was as a kindergarten and first grade teacher.

Between 1965 and 1967, she studied voice with tenor Ralph Errolle in South Pasadena, California, supporting herself by teaching first grade and church and synagogue singing jobs on the weekends.

Career 
In 1967, Auger was teaching first grade in Los Angeles when she won first prize in the I. Victor Fuchs Competition. The prize included a trip to Vienna to audition for the Volksoper. Her audition repertory included three pieces: the two Queen of the Night arias from Mozart's "The Magic Flute," and Olympia's aria from Jacques Offenbach's "Tales of Hoffmann."

Auger made her professional signing debut in 1967 as the Queen of the Night in the Vienna State Opera's production of Mozart's The Magic Flute.

She also appeared with the Los Angeles Philharmonic Orchestra at this time. She was signed by the Vienna Staatsoper soon after her arrival there—despite her lack of knowledge of the German language—by Josef Krips, remaining with the company for seven years. Her debut was in Mozart's Die Zauberflöte under Krips. She made her American debut with the same opera in 1969, with the New York City Opera. Her Metropolitan Opera debut was as Marzelline in Fidelio, under Karl Böhm.

Auger left the State Opera in 1974 to pursue her burgeoning concert career and to devote more time to teaching at the Salzburg Mozarteum, where she held a full professorship for a time in the early 70s. Among her pupils was soprano Renée Fleming, who studied with her in Germany during her year there as a Fulbright scholar.

For almost eight years, in the late 1970s Auger was based in Frankfurt where she was professor of song at the University of Frankfurt. She sang recitals, in oratorios, and in opera.

She made her New York Metropolitan Opera debut in 1978, singing the role of Marzelline in ''Fidelio'' under Karl Bohm. Two years later, the Met approached her to sing Konstanze in Mozart's ''Abduction From the Seraglio,'' and then to cover the role as a standby for a two-week period.

In the mid 70s, Auger traveled to Japan with Helmuth Rilling, serving at the last minute as a soloist in Bach's St. Matthew Passion. (She learned the part on the plane.) It was the beginning of a long and fruitful association with the German conductor, which yielded over 40 recordings. Her debut at La Scala was in 1975 in L'enfant et les sortilèges. From this time, she turned to lyrical roles in opera, preferring to focus on her career as a concert singer, in early music as well as lieder, often accompanied in the latter by pianist Irwin Gage. She performed most of the soprano parts in Helmuth Rilling's Bach cantata cycle of the mid-1970s to mid-1980s, appearing several times at Rilling's Oregon Bach Festival. At the other end of the spectrum, she commissioned new song cycles by Libby Larsen (Sonnets from the Portuguese) and Judith Lang Zaimont. Her association with Rilling led to Auger's first break in the United States, in 1980, when Blanche Moyse, the director of the New England Bach Festival, heard her sing with  Rilling at the Oregon Bach Festival and signed her for a series of concerts the following season.

Auger briefly came to the attention of hundreds of millions of television viewers on July 23, 1986, when she sang Mozart's Exsultate, Jubilate at the royal wedding of Sarah Ferguson and Prince Andrew with the soprano Felicity Lott during the signing of the register.

She later recorded the Exsultate, Jubilate along with the Great Mass in C minor under Leonard Bernstein, in 1990. On December 5, 1991, the bicentenary of Mozart's death, she sang his Requiem with Cecilia Bartoli, Vinson Cole, René Pape, and the Vienna Philharmonic conducted by Georg Solti in St. Stephen's Cathedral, Vienna. 

In 1993, she won the Grammy Award for "Best Classical Vocal Performance" for her recording titled The Art Of Arleen Auger (Works Of Larsen, Purcell, Schumann, Mozart). It was her fourth nomination and first win.

Death
Auger retired in February 1992, after being diagnosed with a malignant brain tumour in the right parietal lobe of her brain. The mass was determined to be a giant cell glioblastoma. She underwent three brain surgeries, flying to the U.S. to receive medical attention at Mount Sinai Hospital in New York City. After the last surgery, Auger returned to Leusden, the Netherlands where she fell into deep coma and finally died at the hospital on June 10, 1993, at the age of 53. 

Following her death, a memorial service was held at the Frank E. Campbell Funeral Chapel where works by Bach, Mozart, Fauré and others were performed by several well-known musicians, including Renée Fleming and Karen Holvik. 

She was buried on a hilltop plot at Ferncliff Cemetery in Hartsdale, New York.

Personal 
Auger was married and divorced twice. She had one brother, Ralph Auger.

Auger was married to a German historian from 1970 to 1986.

In Europe, her German-born husband was her manager during the 16 years of their marriage. In the United States, she had a contract with Columbia Artists Management until 1978. In 1981 she signed with the International Management Group, which also represented Itzhak Perlman.

Recordings
Throughout her career, Auger made nearly 200 recordings ranging from works by Bach, Mozart and Handel to offbeat opera and song projects. Many of her recordings won international awards, including the Grand Prix du Disque, the Edison Prize and the Deutscher Schallplattenpreis.

Arleen Auger's discography of more than 150 recordings, on a variety of European and American labels, includes recent effort in the Four Last Songs of Richard Strauss, recorded with Andre Previn and the Vienna Philharmonic (Telarc CD-80180; CD only). Also persuasive is her portrayal of the Countess in Mozart's opera Le Nozze di Figaro, with the Drottningholm Court Theater Orchestra and Chorus conducted by Arnold Oestman.

Released on London later in 1990 was a disk of Haydn arias with Christopher Hogwood and the Handel & Haydn Society; Mozart's C minor Mass, with Hogwood and the Academy of Ancient Music, and, in the role of Donna Anna, Don Giovanni with the Oestman-Drottningholm forces.

In March 1990, Auger recorded Haydn's Creation for EMI, with Simon Rattle and the City of Birmingham Symphony Orchestra. She also registered an EMI album with Rattle and his orchestra of Mahler's Symphony No. 2 (EMI CDCB 47962; CD only) and Berg's Lulu Suite (EMI CDC 49857; CD only). Auger sang the lead role in a Virgin Classics recording of Monteverdi's work L'Incoronazione di Poppea, also Schubert's songs for the label with the fortepianist Lambert Orkis. Current issues on Virgin include Canteloube's Songs of the Auvergne, with Yan Pascal Tortelier conducting the English Chamber Orchestra (VC 7 90714-2; CD and cassette).

For Deutsche Grammophon, Auger recorded Handel's Messiah with Trevor Pinnock and the English Concert (Archiv 423 630-2 AH; all three formats), the Dixit Dominus of Handel with Simon Preston and the Westminster Abbey Chorus and Orchestra (Archiv 423 594-2 AH; CD only) and Mozart's Exsultate, Jubilate, Coronation Mass and Vespers, with Leonard Bernstein leading the Bavarian Radio Symphony Orchestra.

Discography
 Haydn, Joseph: Il mondo della luna, with Luigi Alva, Anthony Rolfe Johnson, Edith Mathis, Frederica von Stade, Lucia Valentini Terrani, Domenico Trimarchi, the Chœurs de la Radio Suisse Romande and the Orchestre de Chambre de Lausanne, conducted by Antal Doráti, Philips CD 432-420-2 (1992)
 Mozart, W. A.: Great Mass in C minor, Exsultate, jubilate and Ave verum corpus, with Frederica von Stade, Cornelius Hauptmann, Frank Lopardo, the Bavarian Radio Chorus and the Bavarian Radio Symphony Orchestra, conducted by Leonard Bernstein, Deutsche Grammophon CD 431-791-2 (1991) and DVD 00440-073-4240 (2006)
 Handel: Alcina title role, with Della Jones (Ruggiero), Kathleen Kuhlmann (Bradamante), Maldwyn Davies (Oronte), Eiddwen Harrhy (Morgana), Patrizia Kwella (Oberto), John Tomlinson, the City of London Baroque Sinfonia, conducted by Richard Hickox, Warner Classics.

See also
List of notable brain tumor patients

References 

Arleen Auger  Würdigung eines heimlichen star
Written by Ralph Zedler

External links
arleen-auger-memorial-fund.org - information, pictures, music samples
Bach-cantatas.com: Arleen Auger - pictures
Stereophile.com Opinion
 Monography with discography, TV productions and broadcast worldwide
Interview with Arleen Auger by Bruce Duffie, August 21, 1985

Media
.
.
.

1939 births
1993 deaths
American operatic sopranos
American performers of early music
Women performers of early music
Grammy Award winners
Deaths from brain cancer in the Netherlands
People from South Gate, California
People from Hartsdale, New York
20th-century American women opera singers
Singers from California
Classical musicians from California